E128 can refer to:
 Red 2G, a food additive
 A medical form for students and workers now replaced by the European Health Insurance Card
 Element 128, unbioctium, a predicted chemical element; see Extended periodic table § Superactinides